Julio Córdova (7 February 1911 – 9 July 1986) was a Chilean footballer. He played in three matches for the Chile national football team in 1939. He was also part of Chile's squad for the 1939 South American Championship.

References

External links
 

1911 births
1986 deaths
Chilean footballers
Chile international footballers
Place of birth missing
Association football defenders
Magallanes footballers